King's Highway 29, commonly referred to as Highway 29, was a provincially maintained highway in the Canadian province of Ontario. The  route connected Highway 2 (King Street) in downtown Brockville with Highway 15 (Lombard Street) south of Smiths Falls. Between those larger settlements, it provided access to the communities of Forthton, Addison, Frankville, Toledo and Newbliss.

When Highway29 was established in 1927, it consisted of two separated halves. One half connected Brockville with Smiths Falls, while the other connected Carleton Place with Arnprior; Highway15 provided the only provincial highway link between Smiths Falls and Carleton Place, via Perth. The missing link was filled in 1936, and paving of the entire highway the year after. In 1983, it was truncated at Smiths Falls, while the route north of there was renumbered as part of Highway15. The remainder of Highway29 remained until 1998, when responsibility for maintenance of the route was transferred to the United Counties of Leeds and Grenville. It is now known as Leeds and Grenville County Road29

Route description 

Highway29 was a  route that connected Highway2 in Brockville with Highway15 in Smiths Falls.
The former route provides access to several communities between the two locations. It is now designated as Leeds and Grenville County Road29 outside of Brockville.
Traffic levels along County Road29 in 2018 were highest near Brockville, where approximately 11,300vehicles travelled the road on an average day. Approximately 4,300vehicles travelled the road approaching Smiths Falls. The least travelled portion of the road was near Newbliss, where 2,000vehicles used the road, on an average day.
Traffic volumes are unavailable within Brockville and Smiths Falls.

As the route existed prior to being decommissioned, Highway29 began at King Street (itself formerly Highway 2) and Courthouse Avenue in downtown Brockville. Proceeding generally in a northwest direction, the former route travelled one block before splitting around the Leeds and Grenville County Court House, a National Historic Site. Northbound traffic followed Court House Square, Wall Street and Pearl Street, while southbound traffic followed William Street and Court Terrace. Both directions reconvened along William Street and crossed over the Canadian National Railway (CN) Kingston subdivision, adjacent to the Brockville VIA station; Williams Street became Stewart Boulevard north of the overpass.

Highway29 continued into Elizabethtown-Kitley, where some low-density development extended along the route as it transitioned to a rural farmland setting.
After passing through the communities of Tincap and Spring Valley, it curved west briefly before returning towards the northwest. It travelled through the hamlets of Glen Buell and Forthton, meeting the eastern terminus of former Highway42 at the latter.
Curving almost northward, it became fully immersed in farmland for most of its remaining length. It bisected the communities of Addison, Hawkes, and Frankville. After crossing the large marshland surrounding Irish Lake, the former highway made a large sweeping curve to the northeast, bypassing the community of Toledo.

Highway29 entered into a forested area as it travelled around Irish Lake. It turned north and later entered the community of Newbliss, curving northwest and returning to farmland shortly thereafter. At the hamlet of Shanes, the former highway intersected Kitley–South Elmsley Townline Road and crossed into the municipality of Rideau Lakes. Within Smiths Falls the road took on the name Brockville Street. Highway29 ended at a junction with Lombard Street (Highway15 south) and Jasper Avenue that lies immediately south of the Rideau Canal. Through traffic continued north across the canal onto Beckwith Street South (Highway15 north).

History

Early history 
Southern portion from Brockville as far as Toledo was opened as a wagon trail in 1816 by settlers heading inland to the newly established military town site of Perth via Rideau Ferry,
and thus became known as the Perth Road.
Smiths Falls did not begin to develop until the completion of the Rideau Canal in 1832.
In 1837, work began to improve the road north from Brockville, though very little was accomplished over the following ten years, until the United Counties of Leeds and Grenville contracted the construction of a macadamised road from Brockville to Smiths Falls in 1847. This would be completed in 1852 and known as the Victoria Macadamised Road; tolls were collected for approximately a decade. Although numerous realignments straightened and shortened the road over the years, Highway29 would largely come to follow this toll road.

Designation and paving 

Highway29 was first designated as a provincial route by the Department of Public Highways (DPHO), predecessor to the modern Ministry of Transportation of Ontario (MTO), in 1927. It was initially split into two separate halves, with a discontinuity between Smiths Falls and Carleton Place; Highway15 provided the only provincial highway connection between the two towns, via Perth.
Responsibility was assumed by the DPHO for the upkeep of the  southern portion of the road, within the United Counties of Leeds and Grenville, on May11, 1927. The  northern portion, within Lanark County and Carleton County, was assumed on August17, 1927.
Until 1934, Highway29 passed into downtown Almonte. That year saw the route redirected along what is now Christian Street along the western edge of the town, much to the chagrin of local residents.
On January9, 1936, it was announced that the  Franktown Road, connecting Smiths Falls with Carleton Place, would be improved and assumed as a provincial highway.
This officially took place on August5, 1936.

The majority of Highway29 was a gravel road when it was assumed; by 1927 it was paved through Smiths Falls, between Carleton Place and Almonte, and through Pakenham. In addition, the Franktown Road was paved between Smiths Falls and south of Franktown.
Paving operations between Brockville and Smiths Falls commenced in 1929,
with the portion between west of Spring Valley and Forthton being completed that year. The Franktown Road was also paved entirely by then, except within its namesake town.
Paving north of Brockville to the existing pavement west of Spring Valley was completed in 1930, and between Newbliss and Smiths Falls in 1931.
Paving of the segment between Frankville and Newbliss, as well as through Franktown, followed in 1933.
The final gap between Brockville and Smiths Falls — from Forthton to Newbliss — was paved in 1934.

Limited resources in the depression years resulted in other highways receiving priority attention, notably Highway15 and Highway17.
As a result, the remainder of Highway29 was paved in a piecemeal approach. The northern  of the route, near Arnprior, were paved in 1932;
a short segment between Almonte and the Indian River in 1934.
Approximately  were paved south of Pakenham the following year.
The remaining gaps, near Pakenham — a  section south to the Indian River, and a  section north to the Lanark–Carleton county line — were improved by 1937, completing the paving of the highway.

Improvements, concurrencies, and downloading 
Until the 1950s, Highway29 connected to King Street in downtown Brockville via Perth Avenue. On October9, 1952, Stewart Boulevard was opened, connecting with William Street.
A few years later in October 1954, a contract to construct the Brockville Bypass section of Highway401 was awarded.
Construction of the cloverleaf interchange at Highway29 began in 1957.
Both the interchange and the eastbound lanes of Highway401 (from west of Brockville to Prescott) were opened by Minister of Highways, Frederick Cass, on November13, 1959.
The westbound lanes opened 10months later on September16, 1960.

Two other highways were signed concurrently with Highway29 over the course of its existence. In August 1935, the DHO took over the route between Forthton and Westport as Highway42. It was signed concurrently with Highway29 between Brockville and Forthton at the same time.
Until the 1960s, Highway15 connected Smiths Falls with Carleton Place via Perth. By the mid-1950s, the well-established highway network had changed travel characteristics, and the numbering of Highway15 between Perth and Ottawa was confusing motorists. The Ottawa Board of Trade petitioned the Department of Highways to renumber several highways surrounding the city.
The department performed a series of renumberings similar to these recommendations following the extension of Highway 43 on September8, 1961. Highway15 was rerouted between Smiths Falls and Carleton Place to travel concurrently with Highway29; Highway7 was extended along the former routing from Perth to Carleton Place and signed concurrently with Highway15 eastward to Ottawa.

Highway29 was significantly reduced in length during the early 1980s, in order to reduce the redundancy of Highway15. Highway29 was truncated at Smiths Falls, while Highway15 was rerouted along the section of Highway29 between Carleton Place and Arnprior. This change was approved by the provincial government in 1983, without consulting local governments; signage changes were made in the spring of 1984.
This established the route of Highway29 for the remainder of its existence.
As part of a series of budget cuts initiated by premier Mike Harris under his Common Sense Revolution platform in 1995, numerous highways deemed to no longer be of significance to the provincial network were decommissioned and responsibility for the routes transferred to a lower level of government, a process referred to as downloading. Highway29 was downloaded in its entirety on January1, 1998, and transferred to the United Counties of Leeds and Grenville.

Major intersections

References

External links 

 Highway 29 – Length and Route
 Highway 29 pictures and information

029